Paramjit Singh Bahia (10 November 1950 – 2 February 2012) is an Indian-born Canadian former field hockey player who represented Canada on the men’s National Team in the 1978 World Cup, Argentina and the 1979 Pan Am Games (silver medal), Puerto Rico.

References 

1950 births
2012 deaths
Sportspeople from Jalandhar
Field hockey players from Punjab, India
Indian emigrants to Canada
Canadian male field hockey players
1978 Men's Hockey World Cup players
Canadian people of Punjabi descent
Canadian sportspeople of Indian descent